Hearts of Men is a 1928 American silent drama film directed by James P. Hogan and starring Mildred Harris, Thelma Hill and Warner Richmond.

Cast
 Mildred Harris as 	Alice Weston
 Thelma Hill as 	Doris Weston
 Cornelius Keefe as John Gaunt
 Warner Richmond as William Starke
 Julia Swayne Gordon as Mrs. Robert Weston
 Harry McCoy as Tippy Ainsworth

References

Bibliography
 Connelly, Robert B. The Silents: Silent Feature Films, 1910-36, Volume 40, Issue 2. December Press, 1998.
 Munden, Kenneth White. The American Film Institute Catalog of Motion Pictures Produced in the United States, Part 1. University of California Press, 1997.

External links
 

1928 films
1928 drama films
1920s English-language films
American silent feature films
Silent American drama films
American black-and-white films
Films directed by James Patrick Hogan
1920s American films